The New Relative is a 1934 Hungarian comedy film directed by Béla Gaál.

Cast
 Zita Perczel as Kitty (as Perczel Zitta)
 Ferenc Delly as Esztáry Miklós
 Gyula Gózon as Esztáry Sándor
 Lili Berky as Tóni néni, Esztáry felesége (as Berky Lilly)
 Ella Gombaszögi as Emma néni
 Gyula Kabos as Sámson fõpincér
 Ida Turay as Málcsi (as Turai Ida)
 Sándor Pethes as Bernáth István
 Attila Petheö as Ujváry (as Pethõ Attila)
 Erzsi Ákos as Ujváry Irén
 Klári Tolnay as Kenyereslány

References

External links
 

1934 films
1934 comedy films
Hungarian comedy films
1930s Hungarian-language films
Hungarian black-and-white films